The 1924 Memorial Cup final was the sixth junior ice hockey championship of the Canadian Amateur Hockey Association. The George Richardson Memorial Trophy champions Owen Sound Greys of the Ontario Hockey Association in Eastern Canada competed against the Abbott Cup champions Calgary Canadians of the Calgary City Junior Hockey League in Western Canada. In a two-game, total goal series, held at Shea's Amphitheatre in Winnipeg, Manitoba, Owen Sound won their 1st Memorial Cup, defeating Calgary 7 goals to 5.

Scores
Game 1: Owen Sound 5-3 Calgary
Game 2: Calgary 2-2 Owen Sound

Winning roster
Dutch Cain, George Elliott, Bev Flairity, Ted Graham, Butch Keeling, H. Silverthorne, Headley Smith, Cooney Weiland, Shorty Wright.  Coach: E.T. Hicks

References

External links
 Memorial Cup
 Canadian Hockey League

Mem
Memorial Cup tournaments
Ice hockey in Winnipeg